Sanmenxia railway station is a station on Longhai railway in Hubin District, Sanmenxia, Henan.

History 
The station was established in 1927.

See also 
 Sanmenxia West railway station
 Sanmenxia South railway station, a high-speed railway station on Zhengzhou–Xi'an High-Speed Railway

References

Railway stations in Henan
Stations on the Longhai Railway
Railway stations in China opened in 1927